, also Ritsu school, is one of the six schools of Nara Buddhism in Japan, noted for its use of the Vinaya textual framework of the Dharmaguptaka, one of the early schools of Buddhism. The Ritsu school was founded in Japan by the blind Chinese priest Jianzhen, better known by his Japanese name Ganjin. Ganjin traveled to Japan at the request of Japanese priests, and established the Tōshōdai-ji in Nara. During the Kamakura period, the Ritsu sect was divided into schools at Tōshōdai-ji, Kaidan-in, Saidai-ji, and Sennyū-ji. However, during the Meiji period, the Ritsu sect was incorporated within the Shingon sect by decree of the Japanese government. Today only Tōshōdai-ji, which resisted the government measures, retains its identity as a Ritsu temple.

See also
 Buddhism in Japan
 Dharmaguptaka
 Schools of Buddhism
 Vinaya

References

Bibliography
 Bunyiu Nanjio (1886). A short history of the twelve Japanese Buddhist sects, Tokyo: Bukkyo-sho-ei-yaku-shupan-sha, pp. 20–31

Schools of Buddhism founded in Japan
Buddhism in the Nara period